Volkert Van Buren House is a historic home located near Fulton in Oswego County, New York.  It is a Federal style structure constructed about 1832.

It was listed on the National Register of Historic Places in 1988.

References

Houses on the National Register of Historic Places in New York (state)
Federal architecture in New York (state)
Houses completed in 1832
Houses in Oswego County, New York
National Register of Historic Places in Oswego County, New York